Lynette Cegelski is an American physical chemist and chemical biologist who studies extracellular structures such as biofilms and membrane proteins. She is an associate professor of chemistry and, by courtesy, of chemical engineering at Stanford University. She is a Stanford Bio-X and Stanford ChEM-H affiliated faculty member.

Education 
Cegelski studied Chemistry at SUNY Binghamton in New York and graduated summa cum laude and a member of Phi Beta Kappa in 1998. She then worked in the lab of Jacob Schaefer at Washington University in St. Louis (WUSTL), earning a PhD in Biophysical Chemistry in 2004. Her post-doctoral work was in Molecular Microbiology at the Washington University School of Medicine.

Research 
The Cegelski Lab investigates the structure and function of bacterial cell walls and extracellular structures, including amyloid fibers and biofilms.

Key Publications 
Cegelski has authored or co-authored multiple publications that have been cited 100 or more times. As of January 2021, these include:

 "The biology and future prospects of antivirulence therapies," Nature Reviews Microbiology.
 "Morphological plasticity as a bacterial survival strategy," Nature Reviews Microbiology.
 "Small-molecule inhibitors target Escherichia coli amyloid biogenesis and biofilm formation," Nature Chemical Biology.
 "Conformation of microtubule-bound paclitaxel determined by fluorescence spectroscopy and REDOR NMR," Biochemistry.
 "Oritavancin exhibits dual mode of action to inhibit cell-wall biosynthesis in Staphylococcus aureus," Journal of Molecular Biology.
 "Mechanochemical unzipping of insulating polyladderene to semiconducting polyacetylene," Science.
 "Phosphoethanolamine cellulose: a naturally produced chemically modified cellulose," Science.

Awards 
Cegelski's work has earned her several awards:

 Presidential Early Career Award for Scientists and Engineers (PECASE)
Burroughs Wellcome Career Award at the Scientific Interface, for "Mapping the structural and functional landscape of the microbial extracellular matrix."
 2010 NIH Director's New Innovator Award, for "Structure, Function, and Disruption of Microbial Amyloid Assembly and Biofilm Formation."
 National Science Foundation CAREER Award, for "Form and Function of Bacterial Amyloid Fibers."

References

External links 

 Lab website
 Lynette Cegelski publications indexed by Google Scholar

Living people
Year of birth missing (living people)
Stanford University Department of Chemistry faculty
Washington University in St. Louis alumni
21st-century American scientists
Physical chemists